Delima may refer to:
 Delima (gastropod), a genus of gastropods in the family Clausiliidae
 Delima, a genus of plants in the family Dilleniaceae, synonym of Tetracera
 Delima, family name, see De Lima